The 1974 London–Sahara–Munich World Cup Rally, known also under the commercial identity of 1974 UDT World Cup Rally, was the second and final of the World Cup Rallies to be held. Drawing inspiration from the 1974 FIFA World Cup which was held in Munich, the rally began in London, Great Britain and travelled to Munich, Germany, via Nigeria. It was won by the privateer Australian crew of Jim Reddiex, Ken Tubman and André Welinski, driving a Citroën DS.

70 cars entered the race - 19 finished. The number of cars entering was lower than the 1970 London to Mexico World Cup Rally as the 1973 oil crisis and the resultant drop in global car sales had its effect on motorsport budgets. Many of the manufacturer teams of the 1970 event did not take part four years later. An error in the navigation notes of the event, caused by the end of a road in Algeria being extended several miles in between the compilation of the notes and the rally taking place saw the majority of competitors becoming lost in the Algerian Sahara Desert. This, in combination with the most gruelling terrain ever traversed by an international rally to that point saw only seven cars travel the full distance south into Nigeria, with only five then completing the full competition distance to Germany. Of the remainder of the "Kano Seven". the Lancia Fulvia of Shekhar Mehta and Lofty Drews suffered engine problems on the return leg from Kano to Tamanresset, was towed to Tunis and air-freighted to Salzburg to take part in the final part of the event.  The V8 Jeep crewed by Americans Brian Chuchua, Douglas Fortin and Richard Clark made it through Africa, but crashed out of the event following a collision with a large dog in Turkey.

The majority of the competition did not complete the southernmost leg of the rally, south of the Tamanrasset rally point. Aerial searches for lost competing vehicles were conducted and eventually all cars were accounted for with no casualties. Some competitors abandoned the route and found their own way out of Africa. Notably former Grand Prix racer Stirling Moss and his co-drivers Mike Taylor and Allan Sell in their Mercedes-Benz arrived at an Algerian military fort with no water to find it abandoned. Moss and his crew-mates were unable to continue until the arrival of a water convoy in the following days.

Time penalties quickly climbed into large figures during the stages held in Africa with the majority of the field finishing with over a week's worth of time penalties at the finish. The gap between the winning Citroën DS over the first of the factory supported Peugeots that finished second, third and fourth was over 28 hours. The 19th and last classified finisher acquired over 450 hours of time penalties, approximately 18 days behind the winners.

Route and scoring
The course covered approximately  through Europe and northern Africa before returning to Europe.  Some of the principal towns and cities visited were, in order:

 London, England
 Southampton, England
 Le Havre, France
 Rouen
 Bordeaux
 Bayonne
 Bilbao, Spain
 Burgos
 Córdoba, Spain
 Algeciras
 Tangier, Morocco
 Meknes
 Missour
 Béchar, Algeria
 Adrar, Algeria
 Reggane
 In Salah
 Tamanrasset
 In Guezzam
 Assamakka, Niger
 Arlit
 Agadez
 Tahoua
 Kano, Nigeria
 Tahoua, Niger
 Agadez
 Arlit
 Assamakka
 In Guezzam, Algeria
 Tamanrasset
 In Aménas
 Fort-Saint, Tunisia, near Ghadames, Libya
 Gabès, Tunisia
 Tunis
 Trapani, Italy
 Palermo
 Messina
 Izmir, Turkey
 Istanbul
 Thessaloniki, Greece
 Skopje
 Split, Yugoslavia
 Hijeka
 Munich, Germany

Time penalties were given for exceeding set times on the special stages, as well as for other infractions of the rules, and the cars' positions determined by the penalties awarded rather than lowest cumulative times.

Results

Only 19 cars finished the event, with only five cars completing the full rally distance. The route included a 171 km loop in the Hoggar mountains on the southbound transition of Algeria; of the "Kano Seven" only the winning Citroën and the Lancia Fulvia of Shekhar Mehta and Lofty Drews completed this part of the course.  The Escort of Eric Jackson and Bob Bean also completed the loop, but although they started the leg to Kano, they turned back for Tamanrasset after incurring suspension damage in Niger.

References

Rally racing series
London Sahara Munich World Cup Rally
Motorsport in Africa
Motorsport in Europe
1974 in European sport
1974 in African sport